The Casino Theatre was a Broadway theatre located at 1404 Broadway and West 39th Street in New York City. Built in 1882, it was a leading presenter of mostly musicals and operettas until it closed in 1930.

The theatre was the first in New York to be lit entirely by electricity, popularized the chorus line and later introduced white audiences to African-American shows. It originally seated approximately 875 people, however the theatre was enlarged in 1894 and again in 1905, after a fire, when its capacity was enlarged to 1,300 seats. It hosted a number of long-running comic operas, operettas and musical comedies, including Erminie, Florodora, The Vagabond King and The Desert Song. It closed in 1930 and was demolished the same year.

History

The Casino Theatre, designed in Moorish Revival style by architects Francis Hatch Kimball and Thomas Wisedell, was the first theatre in New York to be lit entirely by electricity. It was built in 1882 more than 15 blocks north of where the theatre district was then centered, 23rd Street. In 1890, New York's first roof garden was added to the theatre. It originally seated approximately 875 people, however the theatre was enlarged in 1894 and again when it was rebuilt in 1905 after a fire in 1903. The redesigned Casino seated 1,300.

The theatre opened with productions by the McCaull Comic Opera Company. It was first managed by producer and composer Rudolph Aronson, and later by Canary & Lederer from 1894 to 1903, and from 1903 by the Shuberts. As the center  of the Broadway theatre district moved uptown, north of 42nd Street, the Casino closed in 1930. It was demolished the same year, along with the nearby Knickerbocker Theatre, to make way for the expanding Garment District.

The Casino hosted a series of successful operettas and other musical theatre pieces in the 1880s and 1890s, including the extraordinarily successful Erminie. In 1891, it premiered Cavalleria Rusticana in America, and in 1894 it presented the first Broadway revue, The Passing Show. In 1898, it was host to the premiere of Clorindy, or The Origin of the Cake Walk, the first African-American musical to be presented before a white audience.

The theatre is perhaps best remembered, however, as having been the home of the 1900 production of the Edwardian musical comedy, Florodora. In that show, it became the first theatre in New York to feature a chorus line, the "Florodora Sextet". The sextet's original lineup included a number of ladies who would later achieve fame and fortune. The production "elevated the chorus girl into ... an attraction in its own right." Evelyn Nesbit was a chorus girl in the show in 1901. Over the decades, the theatre also became known for its free Christmas presentations for New York children.

Over the next decade, the theatre continued to present musicals and operettas, some of the most successful being A Chinese Honeymoon (1902), The Earl and the Girl (1905) and The Chocolate Soldier (1909). During World War I, it hosted transfers of several of the Princess Theatre musicals, among other musicals, such as The Blue Paradise (1915) and Sometime (1918). In the 1920s, the theatre was the home of several hit operettas, particularly The Vagabond King and The Desert Song. Although the Casino had led the move uptown by the Broadway theatre district, by 1930, most of the theatres had moved even further north, to the West 40s. The last performance was the opera Faust presented by the American Opera Company on January 18, 1930 with tenor Charles Kullman in the title role and soprano Nancy McCord as Marguerite. The theatre was demolished a month later.

Notable productions

1882: The Queen's Lace Handkerchief
1883: The Beggar Student
1884: Nell Gwynne
1885: Die Fledermaus
1886: Erminie
1888: The Yeomen of the Guard
1890: The Grand Duchess
1891: Cavalleria Rusticana
1894: The Passing Show
1895: The Wizard of the Nile
1896: The Lady Slavey
1896: In Gay New York
1897: The Belle of New York
1898: Clorindy, or The Origin of the Cake Walk 
1900: Florodora
1900: The Casino Girl
1900: The Belle of Bohemia
1901: The Little Duchess
1902: A Chinese Honeymoon
1903: The Runaways
1904: Piff! Paff!! Pouf!!!
1904: Baroness Fiddlesticks
1905: The Earl and the Girl
1909: Havana
1909: The Chocolate Soldier
1912: The Firefly
1912–13: Seasons of Gilbert and Sullivan
1914: High Jinks
1915: The Blue Paradise
1916: Very Good Eddie
1917: Oh, Boy!
1918: Oh, Lady! Lady!!
1918: Sometime
1921: Tangerine
1922: Sally, Irene and Mary
1923: Wildflower
1924: I'll Say She Is – Marx Brothers
1925: The Vagabond King
1926: The Desert Song
1928: My Maryland
1929: The New Moon
1930: American Opera Company's Madama Butterfly and Faust

References

External links

Casino Theatre at the Internet Broadway Database
Photos of the theatre and its stars

Former Broadway theatres
Demolished theatres in New York City
Demolished buildings and structures in Manhattan
1882 establishments in New York (state)
1930 disestablishments in New York (state)
Buildings and structures demolished in 1930